The 2016 Il Lombardia (also known as the Giro di Lombardia or the Tour of Lombardy) took place in Lombardy in Northern Italy on 1 October 2016. It was the 110th edition of the Il Lombardia road bicycle race and the closing event of the 2016 UCI World Tour.

Colombian rider Esteban Chaves won the race in a three-man sprint in Bergamo with Italian Diego Rosa and his countryman Rigoberto Urán.

Teams 

The 18 UCI World Tour teams were automatically invited and obliged to line up. The race organisation invited seven further UCI Professional Continental teams with wildcards. Each team had a maximum of eight riders:

Race report

Results

References

2016
2016 UCI World Tour
2016 in Italian sport
October 2016 sports events in Europe